Quibell Park Stadium is a stadium in Scunthorpe, North Lincolnshire, owned by North Lincolnshire Council, primarily used for athletics, cycling, and American football. The stadium consists of a velodrome, an athletics track, and a sports field.

History
The area was first opened as a park in 1949 by the Duke and Duchess of Gloucester, but in 1965 the stadium was opened and named after Labour Party politician David Quibell, 1st Baron Quibell.

In 2008 the stadium was chosen as a possible training venue for the 2012 Summer Olympics.  The stadium is surrounded by a velodrome.

References 

Sports venues in Scunthorpe
Velodromes in England
Cycle racing in England
American football venues in the United Kingdom
Defunct speedway venues in England